The following lists events in the year 1988 in China.

Incumbents
General Secretary of the Communist Party: Zhao Ziyang
President: Li Xiannian, Yang Shangkun
Premier: Zhao Ziyang, Li Peng
Vice President: Ulanhu (until April 8), Wang Zhen (starting April 8)
Vice Premier: Wan Li (until 25 March), Yao Yilin (starting 25 March)

Governors 
 Governor of Anhui Province – Lu Rongjing 
 Governor of Fujian Province – Wang Zhaoguo 
 Governor of Gansu Province – Jia Zhijie
 Governor of Guangdong Province – Ye Xuanping 
 Governor of Guizhou Province – Wang Zhaowen
 Governor of Hainan Province – Liang Xiang then Liu Jianfeng
 Governor of Hebei Province – Xie Feng then Yue Qifeng 
 Governor of Heilongjiang Province – Hou Jie 
 Governor of Henan Province – Cheng Weigao 
 Governor of Hubei Province – Guo Zhenqian  
 Governor of Hunan Province – Xiong Qingquan 
 Governor of Jiangsu Province – Gu Xiulian 
 Governor of Jiangxi Province – Wu Guanzheng  
 Governor of Jilin Province – He Zhukang 
 Governor of Liaoning Province – Li Changchun 
 Governor of Qinghai Province – Song Ruixiang  
 Governor of Shaanxi Province – Hou Zongbin
 Governor of Shandong Province – Jiang Chunyun 
 Governor of Shanxi Province – Wang Senhao 
 Governor of Sichuan Province – Jiang Minkuan (until January), Zhang Haoruo (starting February)
 Governor of Yunnan Province – Li Jiating 
 Governor of Zhejiang Province – Xue Ju (until January), Shen Zulun (starting February)

Events
7th National People's Congress
18 January – China Southwest Airlines Flight 4146
24 January – According to Chinese government official confirmed report, a Kunming to Shanghai  passenger train crush, and 13 cars derailment in Qujing, Yunnan Province, total kills 80 person and injures 65 person.  
14 March – Johnson South Reef Skirmish
17 September – China National Petroleum Corporation was established, as changing from Petroleum and chemical industrial section of PRC. (People's Republic of China)
December–January 1989 – Nanjing anti-African protests
unknown date
 Ping An Insurance founded.
 Xigang Real Estate Development, as predecessor of Wanda Group founded in Dalian, Liaoning Province.
 Skyworth was founded in Shenzhen.

Culture
List of Chinese films of 1988

Sport
China at the 1988 Summer Paralympics
China at the 1988 Summer Olympics won a total of 28 medals
China at the 1988 Winter Olympics won no medals

Births 
 January 21 – Xiao Yiming
 February 3 – Qian Jialing
 February 21 – Fan Jiachen
 March 14 – Ma Sichun, Chinese actress
 June 23 – Fu Yanlong
 November 25 – Rong Jing

Deaths 

 Liang Shuming
 Li Fenglou
 Chen Shixiang

References

 
China
Years of the 20th century in China
1980s in China
China